William Joseph Phyle (June 25, 1875 – August 6, 1953), born in Duluth, Minnesota was a pitcher for Major League Baseball's Chicago Orphans (1898–99) and New York Giants (1901) and a third baseman for the St. Louis Cardinals (1906). He pitched a shutout on his Major League debut, in a 9-0 victory over the Washington Senators on September 17, 1898.

After his playing career finished, Phyle was an umpire in the Pacific Coast League.

References

Sources

1875 births
1953 deaths
Sportspeople from Duluth, Minnesota
Chicago Orphans players
New York Giants (NL) players
St. Louis Cardinals players
Major League Baseball pitchers
Toronto Maple Leafs (International League) players
St. Paul Apostles players
St. Paul Saints (Western League) players
Minneapolis Millers (baseball) players
Milwaukee Brewers (minor league) players
Memphis Egyptians players
Johnstown Johnnies players
Kansas City Blues (baseball) players
Baseball players from Minnesota
Native American baseball players
19th-century baseball players